Eaton Place is a street in London's Belgravia district.

It runs off the top left hand corner of Eaton Square and then parallel to it until a junction with Upper Belgrave Street.

The Embassy of Hungary, London is at no 35.

The 1971 TV series Upstairs, Downstairs is set at no 165.

On 22 June 1922, Field Marshal Sir Henry Wilson, 1st Baronet was assassinated outside his home at no 36 by Irish Republican Army members Reginald Dunne and Joseph O'Sullivan.

References

Belgravia
Streets in the City of Westminster